Ungernia is a genus  of bulb-forming plants in the Amaryllis family, native to central and south-central Asia Asia (Iran, Afghanistan, Kazakhstan, Uzbekistan, Turkmenistan, Kyrgyzstan, and Tajikistan).

Species
Ungernia badghysi Botsch. - Turkmenistan
Ungernia ferganica Vved. ex Artjush. - Kyrgyzstan
Ungernia flava Boiss. & Hausskn. - Iran
Ungernia oligostroma Popov & Vved. - Uzbekistan, Kyrgyzstan, Tajikistan
Ungernia sewerzowii (Regel) B.Fedtsch. - Kazakhstan, Uzbekistan, Kyrgyzstan
Ungernia spiralis Proskor. - Turkmenistan
Ungernia tadschicorum Vved. ex Artjushenko - Tajikistan
Ungernia trisphaera Bunge - Iran, Afghanistan, Turkmenistan
Ungernia victoris Vved. ex Artjush. - Kyrgyzstan, Tajikistan
Ungernia vvedenskyi Khamidch. - Kazakhstan

References

External links
Private botanic garden, Bulbs Gallery, Ungernia
 Плантариум, Русскоязычные названия, Унгерния Северцова, Ungernia sewerzowii (Regel) B. Fedtsch. Описание таксона in Russian; numerous photos

Amaryllidaceae genera
Amaryllidoideae
Taxa named by Alexander von Bunge